Charles Howard Walker  (January 9, 1857 – April 12, 1936) was an architect, designer and educator in Boston, Massachusetts, in the late 19th and early 20th centuries. He was associated with the architecture department at the Massachusetts Institute of Technology and was affiliated with Boston's Society of Arts and Crafts.

Biography 
Walker was born January 9, 1857, in West Roxbury, Massachusetts, to George S. Walker and Mary L. Damorell. In 1875 at the age of 18, Walker worked at the architectural office of Sturgis and Brigham, where he had opportunities to study architecture in New York, Europe, and Asia Minor.

In 1885, Walker partnered with Thomas Rogers Kimball and formed the firm Walker & Kimball. This partnership continued until 1899 when it ended after Walker and Kimball were architects in chief for the Trans-Mississippi Exposition and Greater America Exposition in Omaha, Nebraska. Walker practiced architecture solo until 1911 when he formed with his son, Harold D. Walker, the firm C. Howard Walker and Son. In 1925, architect Frederick S. Kingsbury joined the firm and was renamed to Walker and Walker and Kingsbury. Shortly after in 1930, the firm was renamed to Walker and Walker.

Walker was a lecturer at the Massachusetts Institute of Technology and was associated with their department of architecture for forty-nine years. He also lectured at the Boston Museum of Fine Arts and Lowell Institute.

Walker was a member of the Boston Art Commission, National Fine Arts Commission, American Academy of Arts and Sciences, National Institute of Arts and Letters, American Federation of Arts, and the Boston Society of Arts and Crafts. Walker was one of six delegates for the United States at the International Congress of Architects in 1930 in Budapest.

Walker died April 12, 1936, in West Roxbury, Massachusetts.

Designed by Walker

 Mount Vernon Church, Beacon St., Boston, ca.1892
 Trans-Mississippi Exposition, Omaha, Nebraska, 1898
 Bancroft Memorial Library, Hopedale, Massachusetts, ca. 1898
 Electricity building, St. Louis World's Fair, 1903
 Stony Brook Bridge, Back Bay Fens, Boston
 William Fogg Library, Eliot, Maine, 1907
 Stratham Historical Society building, Stratham, New Hampshire, 1912
 originally the George A. and Emma B. Wiggin Memorial Library building

References

Further reading

By Walker
 Architecture of the Library. In: Handbook of the new Public library in Boston. Boston: Curtis & Co., 1895.
 Theory of mouldings. 1926.

About Walker
 American Federation of Arts. American art annual. MacMillan Co., 1905.
 Who's who in New England. A.N. Marquis & Company, 1915.
 William Emerson. Charles Howard Walker (1857–1936). Proceedings of the American Academy of Arts and Sciences, Vol. 72, No. 10 (May, 1938), pp. 396–397.

External links

 WorldCat. Walker, Charles Howard 1857-1936
 Google news archive. Articles about C. Howard Walker.
 Flickr. Photo of nos. 493, 495, and 497 Commonwealth Avenue, Boston;  "built in 1895, and designed by architects Arthur H. Vinal and Charles Howard Walker"
 Flickr. Bancroft Memorial Librar y in Hopedale, Massachusetts
 MIT Museum. Portrait by Emil Pollak-Ottendorf of 5 architects: William Felton Brown, Charles Howard Walker, Harry Wentworth Gardner, John Osborne Sumner, William Henry Lawrence.
 

1857 births
1936 deaths
Architects from Boston
19th century in Boston
20th century in Boston